Wiley Post Airport  is a city-owned public-use airport located seven nautical miles (13 km) northwest of the central business district of Oklahoma City, Oklahoma, United States. The facility covers 1,143 acres (463 ha) and has three runways.

It was named after Wiley Post, the first pilot to fly solo around the world, who died in the same 1935 crash as the namesake of the city's other major airport, Will Rogers World Airport.

It is the FAA-designated reliever airport for Will Rogers World Airport and serves business and corporate air travelers and functions as a center for general aviation. In addition, the northwest Oklahoma City airport provides an environment for aviation-related industry.

In the year ending December 5, 2017, Wiley Post logged 70,027 flight operations. This figure accounts for only those operations logged by the air traffic control tower, which is open daily from 7 A.M. until 10 P.M.

The airport provides a base for over 300 aircraft in its leased hangars. These range from single and twin engine planes to turboprop and jet aircraft.

References

External links
 
 

Buildings and structures in Oklahoma City
Transportation in Oklahoma City
Airports in Oklahoma